Morpho luna is a Neotropical butterfly.

Description
Morpho athena is a large white butterfly.

Distribution
This species is present in Mexico, Honduras and Guatemala.

Taxonomy
Morpho luna may be a subspecies of Morpho polyphemus and be called Morpho polyphemus luna.

References

External links
"Morpho Fabricius, 1807" at Markku Savela's Lepidoptera and Some Other Life Forms

Morpho
Nymphalidae of South America
Butterflies described in 1869
Butterflies of North America
Taxa named by Arthur Gardiner Butler